Oklahoma Question 802, the Oklahoma Medicaid Expansion Initiative, was a 2020 ballot measure on the June 30 ballot (alongside primaries for various statewide offices) to expand Medicaid in the state of Oklahoma. It passed narrowly, over the objections of many prominent state elected officials, such as Oklahoma's governor Kevin Stitt. Medicaid expansion went into effect on July 1, 2021.

Contents
The proposal was listed on ballots as follows:

The wording was challenged by the Oklahoma Council of Public Affairs, a conservative think tank, which claimed that it was unconstitutional and misrepresenting what the measure actually does. The Oklahoma Supreme Court rejected their challenge.

Support

The Oklahoma Hospital Association, Oklahoma State Medical Association, Oklahoma Osteopathic Association, Oklahoma Nurses Association, and Saint Francis Health System filed a joint brief endorsing the proposal, writing "the initiative petition will allow the citizens of Oklahoma to demand that the state accept the federal dollars that 36 other states and the District of Columbia have already accepted in order to bring Medicaid coverage to many of their fellow Oklahomans who remain uninsured."

Oklahoma Senate Democrats supported the proposal and released a statement after its passage thanking voters.

Opposition
Many prominent Republican politicians in Oklahoma, such as the governor Kevin Stitt, and the Oklahoma Senate Appropriations Chairman Roger Thompson, opposed the proposal, citing its potential costs and claiming that cuts to other areas such as education might be necessary.

Results

The ballot measure passed narrowly, with 50.49% voting in favor to 49.51% voting against. Much of the proposal's support came from Tulsa and Oklahoma City. 90% of counties in Oklahoma voted against the proposal.

Effects
Medicaid expansion was scheduled to go into effect on July 1, 2021.

On August 2, 2021, the Tulsa World reported that over 150,000 additional Oklahomans received SoonerCare due to the effects of the Medicaid expansion.

See also
2020 Missouri Amendment 2, a similar ballot measure in Missouri
List of Oklahoma ballot measures
2020 Oklahoma elections

References

External links
 
 YES on 802, a website supporting the initiative

question 802
Oklahoma State Question 802
Oklahoma ballot measures
Affordable Care Act